MH & xmh: Email for Users & Programmers is the first book in history to have been published within the Internet.

The book was written by  Jerry Peek and published online during the month of June, 1996,  the contents are advice on how to use the email commands which are part of the MH mail program  on Unix systems,  including dealing with three interfaces xmh, exmh and mh-e, which is used within GNU Emacs.

References

Publishing
Texts related to the history of the Internet